Gilles Garnier (died 18 January 1573) was a French serial killer, cannibal, and hermit convicted of being a werewolf. He was alternately known as "The Hermit of St. Bonnot" and "The Werewolf of Dole".

Life
The Werewolf of Dole, Gilles Garnier was a reclusive hermit living outside the town of Dole in the Franche-Comté Province in France. He had recently been married and moved his new wife out to his isolated home. Being unaccustomed to feeding more than just himself, he found it difficult to provide for his wife, causing discontent between them. During this period several children went missing or were found dead and the authorities of the Franche-Comté province issued an edict encouraging and allowing the people to apprehend and kill the werewolf responsible. One evening, a group of workers travelling from a neighbouring town came upon what they thought in the dim light to be a wolf but what some recognised as the hermit with the body of a dead child. Soon after, Gilles Garnier was arrested.

Confession
According to his testimony at trial, while Garnier was in the forest hunting one night, trying to find food for himself and his wife, a spectre appeared to him, offering to ease his troubles and gave him an ointment that would allow him to change into the form of a wolf, making it easier to hunt. Garnier confessed to having stalked and murdered at least four children between the ages of 9 and 12.  In October 1572, his first victim was a 10-year-old girl whom he dragged into a vineyard outside of Dole. He strangled her, removed her clothes, and ate the flesh from her thighs and arms. When he had finished he removed some flesh and took it home to his wife. Weeks later, Garnier savagely attacked another girl, biting and clawing her, but was interrupted by passersby and fled. The girl succumbed to her injuries a few days later. In November, Garnier killed a 10-year-old boy, again cannibalising him by eating from his thighs and belly and tearing off a leg to save for later. He strangled another boy but was interrupted for the second time by a group of passersby. He had to abandon his prey before he could eat from it. In 1572, he brutally attacked an unknown boy who was passing by and tore him in half by biting and tearing at his belly. In 1573, he strangled a girl, ate her flesh, and tore away her left leg and took it to his wife.     

Garnier was found guilty of “crimes of lycanthropy and witchcraft” and burned at the stake on January 18, 1574. Even though Garnier was burned at the stake, his trial was done by the secular authorities and not by the Inquisition, as superstition was not judged by the Inquisition. More than 50 witnesses deposed that he had attacked and killed children in the fields and vineyards, devouring their raw flesh. He was sometimes seen in human shape, and sometimes as a "loup-garou".

See also
 Hans the Werewolf
 List of French serial killers
 Peter Stubbe
 Werewolf of Châlons
Henry Gardinn

References

Citations

Bibliography 
Everitt, David. "Human Monsters: An Illustrated Encyclopedia of the World's Most Vicious Murderers", New York: McGraw-Hill 1993, pp. 13–15. 
Schechter, Harold. "The A to Z Encyclopedia of Serial Killers",  Pocket Books, 2006 
Sidky, H. "Witchcraft, Lycanthropy, Drugs, and Disease: An Anthropological Study of the European Witch-Hunts." New York: Peter Lang Publishing, Inc. 1997. 
Mackay, Charles "Extraordinary Popular Delusions & the Madness of Crowds", New York: Crown Trade Paperbacks. 1980. 

1574 deaths
16th-century executions by France
Executed French serial killers
French cannibals
French hermits
French murderers of children
Male serial killers
People executed by France by burning
French people executed for witchcraft
People from Dole, Jura
Werewolves
Witch trials in France
Year of birth unknown